Rodrigo Souza Santos (born 7 August 2002), commonly known as Alencar, is a Brazilian footballer who currently plays as a forward for Flamengo, on loan from Retrô.

Career statistics

Club

Notes

References

2002 births
Living people
Brazilian footballers
Association football forwards
Retrô Futebol Clube Brasil players
CR Flamengo footballers